Viodo (variant: San Bartolomé de Viodo) is one of thirteen parishes (administrative divisions) in the Gozón municipality, within the province and autonomous community of Asturias, in northern Spain.

References

Parishes in Gozón